Summer Hill, an electoral district of the Legislative Assembly in the Australian state of New South Wales, was first established in 2015, partly replacing Marrickville.


Members for Summer Hill

Election results

Elections in the 2010s

2019

2015

References

New South Wales state electoral results by district